Shahdabad (also Romanized as Shahdābād and Shāhtābād) is a village in Zam Rural District, Pain Jam District, Torbat-e Jam County, Razavi Khorasan Province, Iran. At the 2006 census, its population was 908, in 202 families.

References 

Populated places in Torbat-e Jam County